{{Infobox song contest national year
| Year = 2022
| Country = Austria
| Preselection = Internal selection
| Preselection date = Artist: 8 February 2022Song: 11 March 2022
| Entrant = Lumix feat. Pia Maria
| Song = Halo
| Writer = 
| SF result = Failed to qualify (15th)
| Final result =
}}

Austria participated in the Eurovision Song Contest 2022 in Turin, Italy, with the song "Halo" written by Anders Nilsen, Gabriele Ponte, Luca Michlmayr, Rasmus Flyckt and Sophie Alexandra Tweed-Simmons. The song was performed by Lumix, which is the artistic name of DJ and producer Luca Michlmayr, featuring Pia Maria. On 8 February 2022, the Austrian broadcaster  (ORF) announced that they had internally selected Lumix and Pia Maria to compete at the 2022 contest, while "Halo" was presented to the public on 11 March 2022.

Austria was drawn to compete in the first semi-final of the Eurovision Song Contest which took place on 10 May 2022. Performing during the show in position 13, "Halo" was not announced among the top 10 entries of the first semi-final and therefore did not qualify to compete in the final. It was later revealed that Austria placed 15th out of the 17 participating countries in the semi-final with 42 points.

Background

The Austrian national broadcaster,  (ORF), broadcasts the event within Austria and organises the selection process for the nation's entry. ORF confirmed their intentions to participate at the 2022 Eurovision Song Contest on 20 October 2021. In  and since , ORF has held an internal selection to choose the artist and song to represent Austria at the contest.

 Before Eurovision 

 Internal selection 
Artists were nominated by the ORF Eurovision Song Contest Team, which collaborated with music expert Eberhard Forcher who worked on the selection of the Austrian entries since , to submit songs to the broadcaster. In November 2021, Forcher revealed that four artists had been shortlisted: an electronic duo from South Tyrol and active in Vienna, an electro-swing and EDM band with a female singer, a funk band from Styria, and a DJ and producer with a female singer. A final decision was to be made by December 2021 but later delayed to late January 2022. The 24 artists involved in the selection were revealed on 4 February 2022 and consisted of:

 
 Benny König
 Candlelight Ficus
 Christl
 
 
 Diego Federico
 Fred Owusu
 Freude
 Gary Lux
 Lumix
 Matthias Nebel
 
 Miblu
 Popmaché
 
 Rian
 Rydell
 Selina Maria (Sålina)
 Serenity
 Sladek
 Slomo
 Teodora Spirić
 Visions of Atlantis

On 27 January 2022, it was reported that two entries had ultimately been shortlisted: "" performed by Anger and "Halo" performed by Lumix. On 8 February 2022, "Halo" performed by Lumix featuring Pia Maria was announced by ORF as the Austrian entry for the Eurovision Song Contest 2022 during the radio show , aired on Ö3. "Halo" was written by Lumix himself together with Anders Nilsen, Gabriele Ponte, Rasmus Flyckt and Sophie Alexandra Tweed-Simmons. The presentation of the song took place on 11 March 2022 during ''.

Promotion 
During the promotional pre-parties for Eurovision, Pia Maria received criticism for vocal issues in the live performances of "Halo". It was later confirmed that her vocal struggles were due to long COVID, as well as the vocalist's inexperience with in-ear monitors. The Austrian delegation hired a vocal coach to work with Pia Maria to prepare for the contest, and the backing track for "Halo" was transposed into a lower key for future pre-parties.

At Eurovision 

According to Eurovision rules, all nations with the exceptions of the host country and the "Big Five" (France, Germany, Italy, Spain and the United Kingdom) are required to qualify from one of two semi-finals in order to compete for the final; the top ten countries from each semi-final progress to the final. The European Broadcasting Union (EBU) split up the competing countries into six different pots based on voting patterns from previous contests, with countries with favourable voting histories put into the same pot. On 25 January 2022, an allocation draw was held which placed each country into one of the two semi-finals, as well as which half of the show they would perform in. Austria was placed into the first semi-final, which was held on 10 May 2022, and was scheduled to perform in the second half of the show.

Once all the competing songs for the 2022 contest had been released, the running order for the semi-finals was decided by the shows' producers rather than through another draw, so that similar songs were not placed next to each other.

In Austria, all shows were broadcast on ORF 1, with commentary by Andi Knoll and on FM4, with commentary by Kurdwin Ayub, Florian Alexander, Hannes Duscher and Roland Gratzer. The Austrian spokesperson, who announced the top 12-point score awarded by the Austrian jury during the final, was Philipp Hansa, who previously also announced the points for Austria in 2021 and 2019.

Semi-final
Lumix and Pia Maria took part in technical rehearsals on 1 and 5 May, followed by dress rehearsals on 9 and 10 May. This included the jury show on 9 May where the professional juries of each country watched and voted on the competing entries.

The Austrian performance featured the duo on stage with a giant circular keyboard along with a DJ set. The predominant colour in the Austrian performance was red with jets of pyrotechnics towards the end of the performance. For the contest, Pia Maria performed the song one key lower in order to attain easier vocal results.

At the end of the show, Austria was not announced among the top 10 entries in the first semi-final and therefore failed to qualify to compete in the final. This was Austria's third consecutive non-qualification to the grand final having last appeared in 2018. It was later revealed that Austria placed fifteenth in the semi-final, receiving a total of 42 points: 36 points from the televoting and 6 points from the juries.

Voting 

Below is a breakdown of points awarded to Austria during the first semi-final. Voting during the three shows involved each country awarding two sets of points from 1-8, 10 and 12: one from their professional jury and the other from televoting. The exact composition of the professional jury, and the results of each country's jury and televoting were released after the final; the individual results from each jury member were also released in an anonymised form. The Austrian jury consisted of Die Mayerin, Simone, Tina Naderer, Wolfgang Lindner, and Thorsteinn Einarsson. In the first semi-final, Austria finished in fifteenth place out of seventeen entries, marking the country's third consecutive non-qualification from the semi-finals.

Points awarded to Austria

Points awarded by Austria

Detailed voting results
The following members comprised the Austrian jury:
  – Singer-songwriter, psychologist
 Simone – Musician, songwriter, represented Austria in the Eurovision Song Contest 1990
 Tina Naderer – Singer, producer
 Wolfgang Lindner – Drummer, composer, songwriter
 Thorsteinn Einarsson – Musician, singer-songwriter

References 

2022
Countries in the Eurovision Song Contest 2022
Eurovision